Norman Span, known as King Radio, was a top Trinidadian calypsonian active in the 1930s and 1940s.

He was a waterfront worker in Port of Spain when he started performing in public in 1929. Six years later he started his short-lived recording career.

References

Calypsonians
20th-century Trinidad and Tobago male singers
20th-century Trinidad and Tobago singers